D. Kumaradas (died June 27, 2019)  is an Indian politician. He was elected to the Tamil Nadu Legislative Assembly on four occasions from Killiyur constituency: in 1984 as a Janata Party candidate, 1991 as a Janata Dal candidate, and in 1996 and 2001 as a Tamil Maanila Congress (Moopanar) (TMC) candidate. He floated a new party, called the Tamil Maanila Kamarajar Congress, in December 2002.

G. K. Vasan revived the TMC in November 2014. On 19 April 2016, the party named 26 candidates to contest the 2016 state assembly elections as part of an alliance with the People's Welfare Front and Desiya Murpokku Dravida Kazhagam. The list included S. John Jacob, the incumbent Killiyur MLA, but one week later it was announced that Kumaradas would contest the seat in his place. The constituency was won by the INC candidate, S. Rajeshkumar.

References 

People from Kanyakumari district
2019 deaths
Janata Dal politicians
Tamil Maanila Congress politicians
Janata Party politicians
Tamil Nadu MLAs 2001–2006
Tamil Nadu MLAs 1996–2001
Year of birth missing
Tamil Nadu MLAs 1985–1989
Tamil Nadu MLAs 1991–1996